Alberto Alcocer Torra (born 17 December 1942 in Madrid, Spain) is a Spanish businessman. He is owner,  with his cousin Alberto Cortina, of Alcor Holding, a patrimonial society owner of 12.5% of Grupo ACS, the major Spanish construction company, and of 21% of the wastebasket company, Ence. As of March 2011, according to Forbes, he is ranked 13th richest in Spain and 993rd globally with an estimated net worth of $1.2 billion.

Biography 
His uncle Pedro Cortina Mauri was foreign minister during the Francoist dictatorship. His paternal grandfather Alberto Alcocer y Ribacoba, originally from Biscay,  was Mayor of Madrid in the 1920s and again in the 1930s. As well as Alberto Cortina, his other cousin Alfonso Cortina (died 2020) was also a business executive.

Alcocer studied Law in the Universidad Complutense de Madrid. In 1969 he married in separation of goods with Esther Koplowitz. After it, the cousins started being employed at the company Constructions and Contracts, which the father of his wives had founded.

In 1976, Alberto Alcocer and Alberto Cortina were already managing directors, transforming the company in a group of more than 30 societies. In 1978 they were acquiring 5% of the Development bank, belonging to the Central Bank and, three years later, the cousins acquire some participations in the cement company Portland Valderrivas, which was property of Banesto.

In 1982, they acquire the Bank Zaragozano and, in 1987, they get in the mass media across with the group Estructura. One year later, close to the Group KIO, to that they sold the majority of control of the society Urbanor in exchange for 12% that the Kuwaiti group had in the Central Bank (causative operation of the spectacular revaluation of Urbanor's actions), they create the society Cartera Central. But in 2003 both had to sell his participation of the control in the Bank Zaragozano to Barclays because one of his associates in Urbanor, the architect Pedro Sentieri, denounced them for racket, giving place to the case Urbanor.

The judgment was appealed in protection before the Constitutional Court for having violated the judicial effective guardianship of Cortina and Alcocer, and in June, the Supreme Court made the same, granting them the right to recover 50 million Euros paid to his ex-associates as indemnification.

Some weeks after the absolution of the case Urbanor, the magazine Forbes included Alberto Alcocer between 1000 major fortunes of the world.

References

External links 
 Web site Grupo ACS
 Web site Forbes
 Web Site Empresarios con fortuna

1942 births
Living people
Businesspeople from Madrid
Complutense University of Madrid alumni
Spanish billionaires
People named in the Panama Papers
20th-century Spanish businesspeople 
21st-century Spanish businesspeople
Spanish people of Basque descent